Hasenöhrl (3,257 m) is a mountain of the Ortler Alps in South Tyrol, Italy.

The easternmost summit of the Ortlers, it is located in a triangle between the valleys of Val Martello, Ulten Valley and Vinschgau. It is a popular peak to climb due to its relative ease and far reaching views which include the Ötztal Alps, the Adamello-Presanella Alps and the Dolomites.

References 

 Alpenverein South Tyrol

External links 

Mountains of the Alps
Mountains of South Tyrol
Alpine three-thousanders
Ortler Alps